The Czech Women's Handball First Division is the premier category of the Czech Republic's women's handball national league. It was established in 1993 following the dissolution of Czechoslovakia. Baník Most is the most recent winner as of 2019.

List of champions

 1994  Slavia Prague
 1995  Zlín
 1996  Zlín (2)
 1997  Ostrava
 1998  Ostrava (2)
 1999  Slavia Prague (2)
 2000  Slavia Prague (3)
 2001  Slavia Prague (4)
 2002  Slavia Prague (5)
 2003  Olomouc

 2004  Olomouc (2)
 2005  Zlín (3)
 2006  Veselí nad Moravou
 2007  Slavia Prague (6)
 2008  Olomouc (3)
 2009  Veselí nad Moravou (2)
 2010  Slavia Prague (7)
 2011  Veselí nad Moravou (3)
 2012  Sokol Poruba (3)
 2013  Baník Most

 2014  Baník Most (2)
 2015  Baník Most (3)
 2016  Baník Most (4)
 2017  Baník Most (5)
 2018  Baník Most (6)
 2019  Baník Most (7)
 2020 Not awarded
 2021  Baník Most (8)
 2022  Baník Most (9)

References

Women's handball leagues
Sports competitions in the Czech Republic
Women's handball in the Czech Republic
Women's sports leagues in the Czech Republic